is a passenger railway station located in the city of Kumagaya, Saitama, Japan, operated by the private railway operator Chichibu Railway.

Lines

Station layout
The station is staffed and consists of a single side platform serving a bidirectional track. The log cabin-style station building has a small ticket office, but like all the other Chichibu Mainline stations, there is no ticket barrier. There is a waiting room and toilets, complete with disabled facilities.

Adjacent stations

History
Hirose-Yachō-no-Mori Station opened on 27 March 2003. Its name was chosen from among candidates submitted by 174 residents and those with workplaces in Kumagaya city.

Accidents
On 15 June 2006 at 18:26, an elderly male passenger died after jumping from the platform in front of an approaching train.

Passenger statistics
In fiscal 2018, the station was used by an average of 1219 passengers daily.

Surrounding area

The station is located in a quiet, residential neighborhood.
 Hirosegawara Depot
 Kumagaya Yachō-no-Mori Park
 Saitama Prefecture Kumagaya High School of Commerce
 
 Arakawa River

See also
 List of railway stations in Japan

References

External links

 Hirose-Yachō-no-Mori Station information (Saitama Prefectural Government) 
 Hirose-Yachō-no-Mori Station timetable 

Railway stations in Saitama Prefecture
Railway stations in Kumagaya
Railway stations in Japan opened in 2003